Tseng Cheng-hua (born September 25, 1980) is a Taiwanese former swimmer, who specialized in butterfly events. He is a single-time Olympian (2000), and a top 8 finalist in both 100 and 200 m butterfly at the 2002 Asian Games in Busan, South Korea. 

Tseng competed only in two individual events at the 2000 Summer Olympics in Sydney. He achieved FINA B-standards of 56.13 (100 m butterfly) and 2:04.83 (200 m butterfly) from the National University Games in Taipei. In his first event, 200 m butterfly, Tseng placed thirty-fifth on the morning prelims. He established a Taiwanese record of 2:03.62 to lead against five other swimmers in heat one. Three days later, in the 100 m butterfly, Tseng challenged seven other swimmers in heat three, including Kyrgyzstan's Konstantin Ushkov, silver medalist for Russia in Atlanta four years earlier, and Uzbekistan's top favorite Ravil Nachaev. He posted a time of 56.39 to earn a third seed and fifty-second overall, finishing behind winner Nachaev by more than a second.

References

1980 births
Living people
Taiwanese male swimmers
Olympic swimmers of Taiwan
Swimmers at the 2000 Summer Olympics
Swimmers at the 2002 Asian Games
Male butterfly swimmers
Sportspeople from Taipei
Swimmers at the 1998 Asian Games
Asian Games competitors for Chinese Taipei